Mary Cirelli (born July 4, 1939) is a former member of the Ohio House of Representatives, representing the 52nd District from 2001 to 2004.

References

External links
Profile on the Ohio Ladies Gallery website

Democratic Party members of the Ohio House of Representatives
Living people
Women state legislators in Ohio
1939 births
21st-century American politicians
21st-century American women politicians
People from Uniontown, Pennsylvania